London Buses route 134 is a Transport for London contracted bus route in London, England. Running between North Finchley and Warren Street station, it is operated by Metroline.

History
The route previously continued south past Warren Street station to Victoria bus station. However, following the opening of the Victoria line in 1969 it was cut back to its present terminus at Warren Street. The London Transport Executive stated that the opening of the tube line had reduced the number of passengers travelling between Warren Street and Victoria.

Upon being re-tendered, the route was retained by Metroline with a new contract commencing on 5 February 2005.

On 15 June 2019, the route was shortened; its southern terminus became Warren Street, replacing Tottenham Court Road station. 

In June 2018, it was announced that electric buses would be introduced on this route. On 19 August 2019, new electric buses manufactured by Optare were introduced.

Contract Tendering

On 5 March 2005, a 5-year contract was awarded to Metroline with increased frequencies resulting in an allocation of 31 TPL Monday-Friday, 24 TPL Saturday and 21 TPL Sunday from Holloway Garage (HT).

On 4 February 2012, another 5-year contract was awarded to Metroline.

Current route
Route 134 operates via these primary locations:
North Finchley bus station 
Friern Barnet
Muswell Hill
Highgate Wood
Highgate station 
Archway station 
Tufnell Park station 
Kentish Town station  
Camden Town station 
Mornington Crescent station 
Euston Square station 
Warren Street station

References

External links

Bus routes in London
Transport in the London Borough of Barnet
Transport in the London Borough of Camden
Transport in the London Borough of Haringey
Transport in the London Borough of Islington